Gilbert Achard-Picard (June 17, 1918 – August 17, 1954) was a French bobsledder who competed in the late 1940s. He finished 13th in the four-man event at the 1948 Winter Olympics in St. Moritz.

References
1948 bobsleigh four-man results

Mention of Gilbert Achard-Picard's death

1918 births
1954 deaths
French male bobsledders
Olympic bobsledders of France
Bobsledders at the 1948 Winter Olympics